The 1894 Minnesota Golden Gophers Football Team represented the University of Minnesota as an independent during the 1894 college football season. It was Minnesota's only season under head coach Thomas Cochran, and it featured Minnesota's first trip to Madison, Wisconsin, a game which they were heavily favored to win. However, Wisconsin won a hard-fought game with a score of 6–0. The season also featured Minnesota's first game against Purdue, resulting in a decisive 24–0 victory.

Schedule

Roster
 Center, A. E. Finlayson
 Guards, Everhart P. Harding (captain and right guard); Augustus T. Larson (left guard)
 Tackles, Willis J. Walker (right tackle); John S. Dalrymple (left tackle) 
 Ends, Jack Harrison (left end); William F. Dalrymple (right end)
 Quarterback, Charles H. Van Campen
 Halfbacks, Walter N. Southworth (right half); Charles E. Adams (left half)
 Fullback, Henry C. Cutler
 Substitutes, Edward W. Matthews, William H. Condit, Thomas M. Kehoe, Charles E. Slusser, Joel G. Winkjer, George T. Pettibone
 Coach, Tom Cochrane Jr.

References

Minnesota
Minnesota Golden Gophers football seasons
Minnesota Golden Gophers football